Fantastic Caverns is a show cave located in Springfield, Missouri.  Fantastic Caverns is the only cave in North America to offer a completely ride-through tour, which lasts 55 minutes and is held in a Jeep-drawn tram. The trams drive along the path left behind by an ancient underground river.

History 
The cavern was discovered by John Knox and his hunting dog in 1862.  Knox did not want the cave to be exploited by the Union or Confederate governments as a possible source of saltpeter, so he kept the cave's existence quiet until 1867. Knox put an advertisement in the Springfield paper for someone to explore the cave, and it was first explored on February 14, 1867.  On February 27, almost two weeks later, the Springfield Women's Athletic Club explored the cave.  The twelve ladies are considered the first explorers of the cave, since they carved their names into the rock as graffiti and are mentioned in an article published in the Springfield Tri-Weekly Patriot newspaper.  The cave was renamed "Fantastic Caverns" in the 1950s.

The cave was owned by the Ku Klux Klan from 1924 to 1930, during which they used the caverns as a meeting place. 

The caverns were used as a speakeasy during Prohibition. The caverns also hosted music concerts during the 1950s and 1960s. The shows were broadcast on KGBX radio in the 1970s.

Trivia 
The temperature inside Fantastic Caverns is about 60 °F (15 °C) year-round.  In the winter and fall, billboards advertise that the cave is a "warm 60 degrees," while in the summer and spring, billboards advertise the caverns to be a "cool 60 degrees." The cave hosts over 100,000 visitors a year.

Fantastic Caverns is 6 miles from Jefferson Avenue 562-foot Footbridge and near Ritter Springs Park.

References

External links
 Official website of Fantastic Caverns
 National Caves Association

Caves of Missouri
Landforms of Greene County, Missouri
Show caves in the United States
Tourist attractions in Springfield, Missouri